Julia Elisenda (Eli) Grigsby is an American mathematician who works as a professor at Boston College. Her research began with the study of low-dimensional topology, including knot theory and category-theoretic knot invariants.  She is currently working in the field of machine learning.

Education and career
Grigsby earned a bachelor's degree in mathematics from Harvard University in 1999, after earlier forays into biochemistry and physics. After a year working as an operations researcher in Silicon Valley, she returned to graduate school at the University of California, Berkeley, and completed her doctorate in 2005 under the joint supervision of Robion Kirby and Peter Ozsváth.

She was a postdoctoral researcher at Columbia University and the Mathematical Sciences Research Institute, and joined the Boston College faculty in 2009.

Service
Grigsby belongs to the advisory board of Girls' Angle, a non-profit organization for encouraging girls to participate in mathematics, and is responsible for creating a sequence of video lectures by women in mathematics for Girls' Angle.

Recognition
In 2014 she became the inaugural winner of the Joan & Joseph Birman Research Prize in Topology and Geometry, given biennially by the Association for Women in Mathematics to an outstanding early-career female researcher in topology and geometry.

References

External links
Home page

Year of birth missing (living people)
Living people
21st-century American mathematicians
American women mathematicians
Topologists
Harvard College alumni
University of California, Berkeley alumni
Boston College faculty
21st-century women mathematicians
21st-century American women